The NewsGuild-CWA is composed of 46 U.S. locals and 17 Canadian locals, based largely on geography. Some locals represent the staff of a single publication, organization or company, while others represent the employees of multiple workplaces, with each considered a "unit" within the local.

United States locals 
Albany Newspaper Guild – 31034

 Founded in 1936 as the Newspaper Guild of Albany, NY, with its first bargaining agreement with the Albany Times Union newspaper.

Bakersfield – 39202

 Represents news staff of The Bakersfield Californian.

Boston – 31245

 The Boston Newspaper Guild was founded in 1940.
 More than 300 employees of Boston Globe Media Partners, including the Boston Globe and Stat are represented by Boston News Guild, but as of July 2021 Boston Globe does not have a collective bargaining agreement with them (or the two other unions involved).

Buffalo – 31026

 Founded in 1934 as the Buffalo Newspaper Guild, representing employees of Buffalo News.

California Federation of Interpreters – 39000

 In the 1990's California Federation of Interpreters, affiliated with Locale 39521 (Pacific Media Workers). In 2015 it separated into its current Local 39000.
 In 2019, CFI president Michael Ferreira supported AB5 legislation, which would classify more interpreters as employees, not independent contractors.

Chicago – 34071

CWA (Los Angeles) – 9003

Dayton – 34157

Denver – 37074

Detroit – 34022

Erie – 38187

Eugene – 37194

Florida – 3108

Hazleton – 38216

IAPE – 1096

 The Independent Association of Publishers' Employees represents 1,300 employees of Dow Jones & Company, including the Wall Street Journal.

Indianapolis – 34070

Kenosha – 34159

Kingston – 31180

Knoxville – 33076

Lexington – 33229

Maine – 31128

Media Guild of the West – 39213
The Arizona Republic
Austin American-Statesman
The Dallas Morning News/Al Día
The Desert Sun
Los Angeles Times
Fort Worth Star-Telegram
Southern California News Group
Phoenix New Times

Memphis – 33091

Milwaukee – 34051

Minnesota – 37002

New Hampshire – 31167

NewsGuild of New York – 31003
New York Amsterdam News
 Ars Union – Ars Technica
AskMen
 BuzzFeed News Union – Buzzfeed, Inc.
Consumer Reports
 Daily Beast Union – The Daily Beast
El Diario La Prensa
 Foreign Policy
 Fortune Union – Fortune
The Forward
 The Hour
Insider
JacobinThe Jersey JournalJewish Telegraphic AgencyLa Opinión The Markup
 Dotdash MeredithEntertainment WeeklyMartha Stewart LivingShapeLaw360
Mashable
The Nation
 NBC Digital NewsGuild – NBCNews.com
 The New Republic Union – The New RepublicNew York Daily News New York Mag Union – New York
 The New York Times Guild – New York Times (unionized since 1940s)
 The New Yorker Union – The New Yorker PCMag
 People Magazine Union – People
 Pitchfork
Quartz
The Record, Daily Record, New Jersey Herald
Reuters
 Roosevelt Institute
S&P Global Ratings
 Sports Illustrated Union – Sports Illustrated TIME Union – (Time print staff have been unionized since 1940s, with digital more recently)
Wirecutter
 WIRED Union – Wired.
WPIX

News Media Guild – 31222

 Associated Press union goes back to 1969 when it was called Wire Service Guild
 Democracy Works 
 EFE
 Guardian US''
 Oxford University Press
 Pageant Media 
 United Press International

Northeast Ohio – 34001

Pacific Media Workers – 39521
San Francisco Chronicle
Daily Kos
East Bay Times
The Fresno Bee
Hawaii Tribune-Herald
The Maui News
Honolulu Star-Advertiser
The Mercury News
The Modesto Bee
The Monterey County Herald
The Press Democrat
The Sacramento Bee
International Longshore and Warehouse Union

Pacific Northwest – 37082

Philadelphia – 38010

Pittsburgh – 38061

Providence – 31041

Puerto Rico – 33225

Rochester – 31017

Scranton – 38177

Sioux City – 37123

Southern California – 9003
City News Service
International Documentary Association

Southern California – 9400
Los Angeles Daily News
Press-Telegram

Terre Haute – 34046

Toledo – 34043

United Media Guild – 36047

Utica – 31129

Washington-Baltimore – 32035

WashTech – 37083

Wilkes-Barre – 38120

CWA/SCA Canada locals 

CWA/SCA Canada

Alberta – 30400

Canadian Media Guild- 30213

Halifax – 30130

Kingston Typographical – 30204

Moncton – 30636

Montreal – 30111

New Brunswick – 30664

North Bay – 30241

Northern Ontario – 30232

Ottawa – 30205

Peterborough – 30248

Saskatchewan – 30199

Sault Ste Marie – 30746

Sydney – 30460

Thunder Bay – 30044

Victoria-Vancouver – 30223

Windsor – 30553

Archives 
The Walter P. Reuther Library is the official repository of The Newspaper Guild Official Archives. Walter P. Reuther Library, Wayne State University, Detroit, Michigan.

 Newspaper Guild Records, 1933–1973. 156.5 linear feet.
 St. Louis Newspaper Guild Local 47 Records, 1933–1966. 10.5 linear feet.
 Detroit Newspaper Guild Local 22 Records. 1933–2007. 67.25 linear feet.
 Pacific Northwest Newspaper Guild Local 82 Records. 1950–1976. 6.5 linear feet.
 Columbus Newspaper Guild Local 13 Records. 1934–1986. 5.5 linear feet.
 Newspaper Guild of Albany, N.Y., Local 34 Records. 1936–1989. 5.25 cubic feet.

References 

Trade unions in the United States
Trade unions in Canada
International Federation of Journalists
Journalists' trade unions
Trade unions established in 1933
Communications Workers of America
Guilds in the United States
American journalism organizations
Lists of trade union locals